The Complete Little Orphan Annie is a hardcover book series collecting the complete output of the American comic strip, Little Orphan Annie, written and drawn by Harold Gray from the strip's debut in 1924 to Gray's death in 1968. The newspaper comic strip title as a whole was published uninterrupted during 86 years straight (1924–2010) under the Tribune Media Services syndicate. A strip ranked as the most popular comics strip in its heyday according to a Fortune poll. The publisher of this book series is The Library of American Comics, the series' first volume was released in June, 2008.

Background
The series was first announced in March 2007, by Dean Mullaney of The Library of American Comics, with a planned release in February 2008. After some delays the release date was pushed forward to June, 2008.

This The Complete Little Orphan Annie reprint series was after The Complete Terry and the Pirates and The Complete Chester Gould's Dick Tracy, the third comic strip reprint project in order that was initiated by The Library of American Comics.

Format
The hardcover volumes of this series presents themself in a landscape format of 11 inches × 8.5 inches, approximately (280 mm × 216 mm), allowing three daily comic strips or one full Sunday page to be reproduced per page. The strips are all chronologicly reprinted, the dailies in black-and-white and the Sunday pages reproduced in full color. The books have sewn binding and comes with a ribbon bookmark and a dust jacket. The volumes have extensive indexes over their content, to cater towards scholars. The paper quality is a matte and heavy stock. Editing and design for the books was done by Dean Mullaney.

Biographical essays about the author, Harold Gray, written by the comics scholar, Jeet Heer, which did his doctoral thesis on the very subject of The Little Orphan Annie comic strip. Essays by other comic industry experts also appear. The comic strips have been scanned from original artwork and syndicate proofs of the Harold Gray Archives at Boston University. Extras such as photographs, old strips, reproductions of playbills and period memorabilia tied to the comic strip are included in all volumes.

Volumes

{| class="wikitable sortable"
|+ style="background-color:#B0C4DE" | Volumes
|-
! style="background-color:#D0E4FE" data-sort-type="number" | Volume 
! style="background-color:#D0E4FE" | Release date
! style="background-color:#D0E4FE" | Title
! style="background-color:#D0E4FE" | Period
| style="background-color:#D0E4FE" | Page count
! style="background-color:#D0E4FE" | ISBN
|-
|1||2008-06-24||“Little Orphan Annie: The Complete Daily Comics - Vol. 1 - Will Tomorrow Ever Come?”||1924–1927||384||
|-
|2||2009-01-20||“Little Orphan Annie: The Complete Daily Comics - Vol. 2 - The Darkest Hour is Just Before Dawn"||1927–1929||320||
|-
|3||2009-05-26||“Little Orphan Annie: The Complete Dailies & Color Sundays - Vol. 3 - And a Blind Man Shall Lead Them”||1929–1931||348||
|-
|4||2009-12-29||“Little Orphan Annie: The Complete Dailies & Color Sundays - Vol. 4 - A House Divided (or Will Fate Trick Trixie?)”||1932–1933||276||
|-
|5||2010-06-08||“Little Orphan Annie: The Complete Dailies & Color Sundays - Vol. 5 - The One-Way Road to Justice”||1933–1935||280||
|-
|6||2011-01-18||“Little Orphan Annie: The Complete Dailies & Color Sundays - Vol. 6 - Punjab the Wizard”||1935–1936||276||
|-
|7||2011-08-30||“Little Orphan Annie: The Complete Dailies & Color Sundays - Vol. 7 - The Omnipotent Mr. Am!”||1936–1938||276||
|-
|8||2012-06-19||“Little Orphan Annie: The Complete Dailies & Color Sundays - Vol. 8 - The Last Port of Call”||1938–1940||296||
|-
|9||2013-06-25||“Little Orphan Annie: The Complete Dailies & Color Sundays - Vol. 9 - Saints and Cynics”||1940–1941||296||
|-
|10||2014-06-10||“Little Orphan Annie: The Complete Dailies & Color Sundays - Vol. 10 - The Junior Commandos”||1941–1943||296||
|-
|11||2015-05-05||“Little Orphan Annie: The Complete Dailies & Color Sundays - Vol. 11 - Death Be Thy Name”||1943–1945||288||
|-
|12||2016-01-12||“Little Orphan Annie: The Complete Dailies & Color Sundays - Vol. 12 - It's Only a Paper Moon”||1945–1947||296||
|-
|13||2016-11-15||“Little Orphan Annie: The Complete Dailies & Color Sundays - Vol. 13 - Spies and Counterspies”||1947–1948||296||
|-
|14||2017-10-31||“Little Orphan Annie: The Complete Dailies & Color Sundays - Vol. 14 - Sunshine and Shadow”||1948–1950||272||
|-
|15||2018-11-27||“Little Orphan Annie: The Complete Dailies & Color Sundays - Vol. 15 - Open Season for Trouble”||1950–1951||276||
|-
|16||2019-11-12||“Little Orphan Annie: The Complete Dailies & Color Sundays - Vol. 16 - Here Today, Gone Tomorrow”||1951–1953||280||
|-
|17||TBA||“Little Orphan Annie: The Complete Dailies & Color Sundays - Vol. 17 - Fifty Miles from Nowhere”||1953–1955||264||TBA
|}

References

External links
 Publisher website - IDW Publishing - The Library of American Comics - The Complete Little Orphan Annie
 Preview - The Complete Little Orphan Annie - Vol. 13
 The Library of American Comics' YouTube channel - Inside look: Little Orphan Annie - Vol. 5
 The Library of American Comics' YouTube channel - Inside look: Little Orphan Annie - Vol. 7

The Library of American Comics publications
Comic strip collection books
Comic strips syndicated by Tribune Content Agency
Comic strips set in the United States
1924 comics debuts
2010 comics endings
2008 comics debuts
Adventure comics
Drama comics
Comics about women
Little Orphan Annie